The 2013–14 North Carolina Tar Heels men's basketball team represented the University of North Carolina at Chapel Hill during the 2013–14 NCAA Division I men's basketball season. The team's head coach was Roy Williams, who is in his 11th season as UNC's head men's basketball coach. They played their home games at the Dean E. Smith Center as members of the Atlantic Coast Conference. They finished the season 24–10, 13–5 in ACC play to finish in a tie for third place. They lost in the quarterfinals of the ACC tournament to Pittsburgh. They received an at-large bid to the NCAA tournament where they defeated Providence in the second round before losing in the third round to Iowa State.

Pre-season
The Tar Heels entered the 2013–14 season lost two starters from the previous season as Dexter Strickland graduated and second team All-ACC shooting guard Reggie Bullock declared for the 2013 NBA draft.  However, rising juniors and potential draft picks James Michael McAdoo and P. J. Hairston decided to return to Chapel Hill and UNC brought in a strong recruiting class including McDonald's All-Americans Kennedy Meeks and Isaiah Hicks.

Another offseason change involved the coaching staff as long-time Roy Williams assistant Joe Holladay retired.  UNC alum Brad Frederick joined the staff as Director of Basketball Operations in June.  Frederick came from the coaching staff at Vanderbilt, where he had been for 14 seasons.  He is the son of former Kansas Athletic Director Bob Frederick.

However, the optimism of the Spring turned to uncertainty in the Summer as both Hairston and fifth year senior Leslie McDonald were both suspended from the team due to eligibility concerns, leaving only two scholarship guards (sophomore Marcus Paige and freshman Nate Britt) on the roster entering the season.  McDonald would be reinstated in the non-conference season, but Hairston's suspension would hold for the entire season.

Even with this uncertainty, North Carolina was voted #13 in the AP preseason poll and #11 in the USA Today Coaches' Poll.  The ACC media tabbed the Tar Heels third in the conference preseason poll.

Departures

Recruits

The top-rated recruit in the class scheduled to start college in Fall 2013 is Isaiah Hicks, the eighth ranked power forward and the 18th ranked player in the ESPN 100. Shortly behind him in that ranking is Kennedy Meeks at #59. He is the #6 ranked center in the 2013 high school class. Britt is the 52nd ranked player in the current high school class and 11th point guard. He tore his meniscus in December 2012.

 Isaiah Hicks: 18th ranked player in ESPN 100, eight-ranked power forward, named to the 2013 McDonald's All-America game In his last high school basketball game he had 34 points, 30 rebounds and seven blocks in a win in his division's state championship game.
 Kennedy Meeks: 59th ranked player in ESPN 100, #6 ranked center, and named to the 2013 McDonald's All-America game
 Nate Britt: 52nd ranked player, 11th-ranked point guard

Roster

Note that the roster is subject to change.

Season

Non-conference play
The Tar Heels started the season with uncertainty as Hairston's and McDonald's eligibility cases remained in limbo for the first nine games of the season.  After uneventful victories over Oakland and Holy Cross, the Heels were stunned 83–80 at home by Belmont, in part because of a 22–48 performance at the free throw line.  However, the team would redeem themselves by beating #3 Louisville in the Hall of Fame Tip Off championship.  Marcus Paige led the team with 32 points while post players Brice Johnson and Kennedy Meeks controlled the paint and the Heels won 93–84.  Paige was named ACC Player of the Week for his performance against the Cardinals and the Richmond Spiders in the previous game (26 points).

North Carolina's inconsistency would show itself again as the Heels lost their next game - an 83–86 contest at UAB, coached by former Roy Williams assistant Jerod Haase.  But true to form, the Heels bounced back and beat #1 Michigan State on the road in a game they never trailed.  Kennedy Meeks led the team in scoring with 15 and was named ACC Rookie of the Week.  After an easy home win over UNC Greensboro (coached by Wes Miller, another Williams disciple), the Tar Heels completed a sweep of the top three teams in the preseason polls by upending #11 Kentucky at the Dean Smith Center.  Paige and James Michael McAdoo were the stars, scoring 23 and 20 points respectively.

On December 18, the team received the news that Leslie McDonald would be reinstated in time for the Texas game at the Smith Center.  However, the Tar Heels lost to the young Longhorns.  North Carolina finished their non-conference season with wins over Davidson, Northern Kentucky and UNC Wilmington.

Conference play
The Tar Heels started 1–4 in conference play, but then, they won twelve straight, including a win over #5 Duke on February 20. With the Duke win, North Carolina became the first team to defeat each of the AP Poll preseason top 4 in the same season in the 53 years that the poll has released preseason rankings. The streak was broken with a loss at Duke in Cameron Indoor Stadium.

Schedule and results

|-
!colspan=12 style="background:#56A0D3; color:#FFFFFF;"| Exhibition

|-
!colspan=12 style="background:#56A0D3; color:#FFFFFF;"| Non-conference regular season

|-
!colspan=12 style="background:#56A0D3; color:#FFFFFF;"| ACC regular season

|-
!colspan=12 style="background:#56A0D3; color:#FFFFFF;"| ACC Tournament

|-
!colspan=12 style="background:#56A0D3; color:#FFFFFF;"| NCAA tournament

Team players drafted into the NBA

References

North Carolina Tar Heels men's basketball seasons
North Carolina
North Carolina
Tar
Tar